Shugong Xu from Intel Research, Santa Clara, CA was named Fellow of the Institute of Electrical and Electronics Engineers (IEEE) in 2016 for contributions to the improvement of wireless networks efficiency.

References

Fellow Members of the IEEE
Living people
Year of birth missing (living people)
Place of birth missing (living people)